Robbin Ruiter (born 25 March 1987) is a Dutch professional footballer who plays as a goalkeeper. He plays for Cambuur.

Career
Born in Amsterdam, North Holland, Ruiter started his senior career with FC Volendam in 2009.

FC Utrecht
In April 2012, he signed a pre-contract to join FC Utrecht in July. In his first official appearance for Utrecht, he singled himself out with a stand-out performance, by stopping three one-on-one chances against Feyenoord.

Sunderland
He signed for Sunderland in August 2017 following a successful trial.

PSV
In June 2019, he returned to the Eredivisie, joining PSV on a free transfer.

Willem II
On 30 July 2020, Ruiter joined Willem II for an undisclosed fee on a two-year deal with the option of a third. On 31 January 2022, Ruiter and Willem II agreed to dissolve the contract.

Cambuur
On 23 July 2022, Ruiter joined Cambuur for the 2022–23 season.

Career statistics

Honours
Sunderland
EFL Trophy runner-up: 2018–19

References

External links
Voetbal International profile 

1987 births
Living people
Footballers from Amsterdam
Dutch footballers
Association football goalkeepers
FC Volendam players
FC Utrecht players
Eredivisie players
Sunderland A.F.C. players
PSV Eindhoven players
Willem II (football club) players
SC Cambuur players
Eerste Divisie players
English Football League players
Dutch expatriate footballers
Expatriate footballers in England
Dutch expatriate sportspeople in England